Alfréd Meissner (April 10, 1871 – September 29, 1950) was a Czechoslovak politician and member of the Social Democratic Party in the First Czechoslovak Republic. He was elected to the National Assembly and served twice as Minister of Justice and twice as Minister of Social Welfare of the republic. Following the German occupation of Czechoslovakia during the Second World War, he was deported to the Theresienstadt concentration camp. He survived the Holocaust, and after the war he returned to Prague where he died at the age of 79.

Life 
Alfréd Meissner was born in Mladá Boleslav, a city about 50 kilometres (31 miles) northeast of Prag, on April 10, 1871, in what was then the Kingdom of Bohemia, a crown-land of the Austro-Hungarian Empire. He studied law at the University of Vienna and the University of Prague. After obtaining the degree of Doctor of Law, he worked as a lawyer in Prague. In 1898 he joined the Social Democratic Party (a forerunner of today's Czech Social Democratic Party), of which he became an influential member. He married Rosa Sommer (born 1887), and together they had three children.

When the First Czechoslovak Republic was formed in 1918, he was elected to the Chamber of Deputies of the National Assembly. Meissner made important contributions to statutes and the constitution of the new republic. He served as Minister of Justice of the Czechoslovak Republic from May 25, 1920, until September 15, 1920; and from July 12, 1929, until February 14, 1934. Subsequently, he was made Minister of Social Welfare in 1934. An office he held until June 4, 1935, when he was replaced by Jaromír Nečas. He then briefly held the same post again, from November 5 to December 18, at the end of 1935. In 1930 Meissner was made honorary president of the conference of the International Association of Penal Law in Prague. He was also the managing director of a factory. By reelection (in 1925, 1929 and 1935) he remained a member of the National Assembly until the German invasion and subsequent occupation in 1939.

Due to his Jewish origins, the Germans deported Meissner and his wife to the Theresienstadt concentration camp; they arrived there on January 30, 1942. In Theresienstadt, Meissner was one of the elders of the Jewish Council led by Benjamin Murmelstein. At the end of the war on May 1, 1945, control of the camp was transferred from the Germans to the Red Cross. 
The Commandant of the camp and the SS subsequently fled a few days later, and on May 8 Theresienstadt was liberated by Soviet troops. Meissner returned to Prague in the summer of 1945, where he lived until his death in 1950,  at the age of 79.

References 

Bibliography

External links 
 Alfred Meissner on www.ghetto-theresienstadt.info
 Bratři Emil a Alfréd Meissnerovi 

1871 births
1950 deaths
People from Mladá Boleslav
19th-century Czech lawyers
Jewish Czech politicians
Czechoslovak Jews
Czech Social Democratic Party MPs
National Labour Party (1938) politicians
Government ministers of Czechoslovakia
Members of the Revolutionary National Assembly of Czechoslovakia
Members of the Chamber of Deputies of Czechoslovakia (1920–1925)
Members of the Chamber of Deputies of Czechoslovakia (1925–1929)
Members of the Chamber of Deputies of Czechoslovakia (1929–1935)
Members of the Chamber of Deputies of Czechoslovakia (1935–1939)
20th-century Czech lawyers
Theresienstadt Ghetto survivors
University of Vienna alumni
Charles University alumni